"I Did It" is a song by the Dave Matthews Band, released as the lead single from their album Everyday. It reached #71 on the Billboard Hot 100, #5 Modern Rock Tracks, and #40 on Adult Top 40.

In January 2001, Dave Matthews Band made history by becoming the first major artist to release a single directly to Napster, posting "I Did It" on the controversial file-swapping service 6 weeks before the new album was officially released.

"I Did It" was a significant departure musically for the band, introducing electric guitar and minimizing the use of the violin and horn sections. This musical departure grew significant criticism from many in the fan base.

Track listing

U.S. single
"I Did It" — 3:36

Australian single
"I Did It" — 3:36
"I Did It" (UK edit) — 3:16
"Fool to Think" — 4:13
"Crush" (live) — 10:34

EU single
"I Did It" (US Radio Edit) - 3:38
"I Did It" (UK Radio Edit) - 3:16
CD-Rom Video

Charts

References

Dave Matthews Band songs
2001 singles
Songs written by Dave Matthews
2000 songs
Song recordings produced by Glen Ballard
RCA Records singles
Songs written by Glen Ballard
Music videos directed by Dave Meyers (director)